À la recherche du temps perdu is a 2011 television film by Nina Companéez, based on Marcel Proust's 1913–1927 seven-volume novel In Search of Lost Time.

The two-part film attempts to cover the entire novel with the exception of the first volume, Swann's Way—the narrator's childhood and the story of Charles Swann are only briefly mentioned, the latter having already been previously adapted as Swann in Love (1984) by Volker Schlöndorff.

Critical reception was mixed, with e.g. German newspaper Süddeutsche Zeitung questioning the wisdom and feasibility of filming the novel in its entirety at all. The review in Frankfurter Allgemeine Zeitung pointed out the staginess of the adaptation and found Micha Lescot's slightly tongue-in-cheek performance as the narrator somewhat lacking. Der Tagesspiegel on the other hand praised the adaptation, in particular for its visual opulence and Micha Lescot's acting. Le Figaro also lauded the telefilm both for its screenplay—which it considered accessible in style yet true to the tone of the novel—and the performances, especially by Micha Lescot, Didier Sandre, and Dominique Blanc.

Cast

 Micha Lescot as Marcel, the narrator
 Caroline Tillette as Albertine Simonet
 Didier Sandre as Baron de Charlus
 Dominique Blanc as Madame Verdurin
 Éric Ruf as Charles Swann
 Valentine Varela as Oriane de Guermantes
 Bernard Farcy as Basin, Duke of Guermantes
 Catherine Samie as Marcel's grandmother
 Dominique Valadié as Marcel's mother
 Roland Copé as Count Norpois
 Jean-Claude Drouot as Elstir
 Andy Gillet as Robert de Saint-Loup
 Anne Danais as Françoise
 Marie-Sophie Ferdane as Gilberte Swann
 Michel Fau as Jupien
 Vincent Heden as Morel
 Françoise Bertin as Madame de Villeparisis
 Hervé Pierre as Verdurin
 Philippe Morier-Genoud as Docteur Cottard
 Laure-Lucille Simon as Andrée
 Arthur Igual as Bloch
 Oleg Ossina as Marcel as a boy

References

External links
 

2011 television films
2011 films
French television films
French LGBT-related television shows
Television shows based on French novels
Films set in Paris
Films based on works by Marcel Proust
Films based on French novels
French-language television shows
2010s French films